William D. Evans (born March 3, 1947) is a retired professional basketball point guard who played one season in the American Basketball Association (ABA) as a member of the New York Nets (1969–70). He attended Boston College where he was selected by the Boston Celtics during the 13 round of the 1969 NBA draft, but he never played for them.

External links
 

1947 births
Living people
American men's basketball players
Basketball players from Connecticut
Boston Celtics draft picks
Boston College Eagles men's basketball players
New York Nets players
Point guards